Barada TV is a London-based Syrian opposition satellite television network. Classified U.S. diplomatic cables, provided by the anti-secrecy Web site WikiLeaks, show that the U.S. State Department had funneled $6 million to Barada TV between 2006 and 2011 to operate the satellite channel and finance other activities inside Syria, The Washington Post reported. The State Department refused to comment on this allegation.

In a NPR story in 2011, the channel was described as a low-tech outlet, which is supported by videos sent from Syrian protesters and increasingly funded by donations from Syrians.

See also 
 United States involvement in regime change#2005–2009: Syria

References

Television channels in Syria